Asyprocessa spinus is a moth of the family Erebidae first described by Michael Fibiger in 2010. It is known from western and north-western Thailand.

The wingspan is 8–10 mm. The head, patagia, tegulae, thorax and ground colour of the forewing are grey, suffused with black scales. The basal part of the costa, costal part of the medial area and fringes have indistinct patches of grey black. The antemedial, postmedial and subterminal line are well marked and brown. The hindwing is light grey, with an indistinct discal spot. The underside of the forewing is grey brown and the underside of the hindwing is grey, with a discal spot.

References

Micronoctuini
Moths described in 2010